Natan Bernardo de Souza (born 6 February 2001), simply known as Natan, is a Brazilian professional footballer who plays as a central defender for Campeonato Brasileiro Série A side Red Bull Bragantino.

Club career

Flamengo
Born in Serra, Natan began his career with Flamengo and made his professional debut for the club on 27 September 2020 against Palmeiras. He started and played the whole match as Flamengo drew 1–1.

Red Bull Bragantino (loan)
On 15 March 2021 Red Bull Bragantino signed Natan from Flamengo on loan until 31 December 2021 with a R$5m (€760k) fee, the deal had a buying clause if Natan reach 20 official matches during the loan spell the total transfer fee would reach R$27m (€4.32m).

Red Bull Bragantino
On 22 January 2022 Red Bull Bragantino officially announced that would exercise Natan's buying clause with a contract until December 2026.

Career statistics

Club

Honours

Club
Flamengo
Campeonato Brasileiro Série A: 2020

References

External links
Red Bull Bragantino profile 

2001 births
Living people
Sportspeople from Espírito Santo
Brazilian footballers
Association football defenders
CR Flamengo footballers
Red Bull Bragantino players
Campeonato Brasileiro Série A players